Pentapora is a small genus of bryozoans in the family Bitectiporidae.

Species
The World Register of Marine Species lists the following species:

Pentapora americana (Verrill, 1875)
Pentapora fascialis (Pallas, 1766)
Pentapora foliacea (Ellis & Solander, 1786)
Pentapora ottomuelleriana (Moll, 1803)
Pentapora tubulata Fischer, 1807 (species dubia)

References

Cheilostomatida
Bryozoan genera
Taxa named by Gotthelf Fischer von Waldheim